, shorter name is , is a film production company. The headquarters is in Hyōgo Prefecture, Japan.

Takarazuka Eizo produces films from Takarazuka Revue musical theater, which is inside the building Tokyo Takarazuka Theater now.

Takarazuka Eizo Co. Ltd. is a part of Hankyu Hanshin Toho Group and its film distributor is Toho.

Filmography 
Filmography of Takarazuka Eiga as production company include:
 Koi sugata kitsune goten (恋すがた狐御殿 Koi sugata kitsune goten) (1956)

References

External links 
  http://hyogo.ivory.ne.jp/drama/takarazuka04.html

Television production companies of Japan
Companies based in Hyōgo Prefecture
Hankyu Hanshin Holdings
Film production companies of Japan